The A1300 is the main 'cross town' route in South Shields, Tyne and Wear. The road runs from Simonside to Marsden via Harton Nook. It is 3.7 miles (6 km) long.

Route

John Reid Road
The A1300 begins as the John Reid Road at the junction with the A194. The road proceeds as Dual carriageway through Simonside, Brockley Whins, Biddick Hall and West Harton before passing South Tyneside District Hospital and Temple Memorial Park.

Prince Edward Road
The road then meets King George Road (A1018) and continues as Single carriageway as Prince Edward Road, passing Harton Nook, Cleadon Park and Marsden Estate.

Redwell Lane
The road then becomes Redwell Lane and meets the Coast Road (A183) on the coast at Marsden.

History
The current route of the A1300 was originally the B1300, although when the Tyne Tunnel was completed, they decided to upgrade the B1300 to A-road status, to make easier access to South Shields town centre.

References 

Roads in England
Roads in South Shields